Saint-Denis Cathedral or at greater length the Cathedral of St. Denis, Saint-Denis, Réunion, is a Roman Catholic cathedral located in Saint-Denis, capital of the island of Reunion, a province of France in the Indian Ocean, part of Africa. It is dedicated to Saint Denis, after whom the city of Saint-Denis is named, and is the episcopal seat of the Diocese of Saint-Denis-de-La Réunion.

History
Construction began in November 1829 and was completed in 1832. The whole building was registered as a monument historique on 13 October 1975.

Henri Martin-Granel worked on the windows of the cathedral. The building was built according to plans by an engineer called Paradise, replacing a church of the 18th century. It took its final form in 1863. It was elevated to a cathedral in 1850 and was consecrated in 1860.

See also
Roman Catholicism in Réunion
Basilica of St Denis

References

Roman Catholic cathedrals in Réunion
Buildings and structures in Saint-Denis, Réunion
Roman Catholic churches completed in 1832
19th-century Roman Catholic church buildings in France